Georgia was one of the original seven slave states that formed the Confederate States of America in February 1861, triggering the U.S. Civil War. The state governor, Democrat Joseph E. Brown, wanted locally raised troops to be used only for the defence of Georgia, in defiance of Confederate president Jefferson Davis, who wanted to deploy them on other battlefronts. When the Union blockade prevented Georgia from exporting its plentiful cotton in exchange for key imports, Brown ordered farmers to grow food instead, but the breakdown of transport systems led to desperate shortages.
 
There was not much fighting in Georgia until September 1863, when Confederates under Braxton Bragg defeated William S. Rosecrans at Chickamauga Creek. In May 1864, William T. Sherman started pursuing the Confederates towards Atlanta, which he captured in September, in advance of his March to the Sea. This six-week campaign destroyed much of the civilian infrastructure of Georgia, decisively shortening the war. When news of the march reached Robert E. Lee's army in Virginia, whole Georgian regiments deserted, feeling they were needed at home.  The Battle of Columbus, fought on the Georgia-Alabama border on April 16, 1865, is reckoned by some criteria to have been the last battle of the war.

Secession

In December 1860, Georgia governor Joseph E. Brown, a passionate believer in slavery and southern states' rights, opined that the election of Abraham Lincoln, an anti-slavery Republican, to the U.S. presidency would result in the ending of slavery in the United States. Thus, Brown called upon Georgians to resist anti-slavery interventions, declaring that failure to do so would result in the emancipation of their slaves:

{{quote|text=What will be the result to the institution of slavery, which will follow submission to the inauguration and administration of Mr. Lincoln as the President  it will be the total abolition of slavery  I do not doubt, therefore, that submission to the administration of Mr. Lincoln will result in the final abolition of slavery. If we fail to resist now, we will never again have the strength to resist.|author=Joseph E. Brown|source=letter (December 7, 1860), emphasis added.}}

Later that month, after South Carolina became the first state to issue an Ordinance of Secession, celebrations broke out in Savannah, Georgia. The following month, in January 1861, the Georgia Secession Convention issued its own ordinance, in which it outlined the causes that motivated the state to declare its secession from the Union. The ordinance cited the views of U.S. president-elect Abraham Lincoln and that of the Republican Party against "the subject of African slavery", anti-slavery sentiment in northern free states, and perceived support among northerners for equality for African Americans as reasons for Georgia's declaring of secession:

During the vote of the resolution, the "secessionists cooked the numbers in order to insure their victory," and forced all delegates to sign a pledge to support secession, regardless of their vote.

In a February 1861 speech to the Virginia secession convention, Georgian Henry Lewis Benning stated that the main reason as to why Georgia declared secession from the Union was due to "a deep conviction on the part of Georgia, that a separation from the North-was the only thing that could prevent the abolition of her slavery."

William L. Harris, one Mississippian secession commissioner, told a meeting of the Georgian general assembly that the Republicans wanted to implement "equality between the white and negro races" and thus secession was necessary for the slave states to resist their efforts.

Contemporary Georgian religious leaders also supported slavery. One Georgian preacher condemned Republicans and abolitionists, stating that their anti-slavery views ran contrary to the teachings of the Christian religion, saying that such groups' views were "diametrically opposed to the letter and spirit of the Bible, and as subversive of all sound morality, as the worst ravings of infidelity."

Home front
Governor Joseph E. Brown was a leading secessionist and led efforts to remove the state from the Union and into the Confederacy. A firm believer in state's rights, he defied the Confederate government's wartime policies. He resisted the Confederate military draft and tried to keep as many soldiers at home as possible  to fight invading forces.  Brown challenged Confederate impressment of animals, goods, and slaves. Several other governors followed his lead. During the war, Georgia sent nearly 100,000 men to battle for the Confederacy, mostly to the Virginian armies. Despite secession, many southerners in North Georgia remained loyal to the Union.

Unionism
Approximately 5,000 Georgians served in the U.S. Army in units such as the 1st Georgia Infantry Battalion, the 1st Alabama Cavalry Regiment, and a number of East Tennessean regiments.

Georgia's Rabun County in particular, which did not declare secession from the Union, was highly Unionist, described by some as being "almost a unit against secession." One of the county's residents recalled in 1865 that "You cannot find a people who were more averse to secession than were the people of our county", stating that "I canvassed the county in 1860–61 myself and I know that there were not exceeding twenty men in this county who were in favor of secession."

The dividing lines were often not as clear as they are sometimes viewed in Rabun county during this period. In A Separate Civil War: Communities in Conflict in the Mountain South, Jonathan Dean Sarris examines the wartime experiences of Fannin and Lumpkin counties. Within these two counties, Unionist and Confederate leaning factions fought brutally directly within the home front between 1861 and 1865. Sarris argues that there is a "complex web of local, regional, and national loyalties that connected pre-industrial mountain societies" and that these loyalties are among the major factors that determine the leanings of these mountain towns. The Madden Branch Massacre in Fannin county was one of several atrocities that occurred as the mountain counties divided into pro and anti-Confederate factions. On November 29, 1864, six Georgians trying to enlist in the U.S. Army - Thomas Bell, Harvey Brewster, James T. Hughes, James B. Nelson, Elijah Robinson, and Samuel Lovell - were executed by the notorious Confederate guerilla John P. Gatewood, "the long-haired, red-bearded beast from Georgia" - but, Peter Parris, and Wyatt J. Parton escaped the execution. 

While concentrated in the mountains and large cities, Unionism in Georgia was not confined to those areas and could be found in areas across the state.

Food shortages
By summer 1861, the Union naval blockade virtually shut down the export of cotton and the import of manufactured items. Food that normally came by rail from the Northern states were halted. The governor and legislature pleaded with planters to grow less cotton and more food. The planters refused because at first, they thought the Union would not or could not fight. The planters then saw cotton prices in Europe soared and they expected Europe to soon intervene and break the blockade. The legislature imposed cotton quotas and made it a crime to grow an excess, but the food shortages continued to worsen, especially in the towns. In more than a dozen instances across the state, poor white women raided stores and captured supply wagons to get such necessities as bacon, corn, flour, and cotton yarn.

In some cases, Confederate armies forcibly seized food from Georgians and South Carolinians. The Georgian governor lamented that such seizures of food "have been ruinous to the people of the northeastern part of the State."

As conditions at home worsened late in the war more and more soldiers deserted the army to attend to their suffering farms and families.

Deserter and layout gangs
During the course of the war, some Georgians banded together to resist Confederate authorities. Some were Unionists in their beliefs, but others were anti-Confederate due to Confederate government's policy of impressment and conscription. Deserter gangs were made up of those who had deserted from Confederate forces. Layout gangs consisted of those who had avoided conscription by hiding out. Pro-Confederate Georgians often derided these groups as Tories. Some groups consisted of both deserters and draft evaders. The mountains of north Georgia were one location where many such groups operated. Others operated in the swamps of the Alapaha River in Berrien, Coffee, Echols County, Georgia, and Irwin counties. The Okefenokee Swamp was another location that several anti-Confederate forces occupied during the course of the war. Black Jack Island and Soldiers Camp Island are two locations within the swamp where over 1,000 deserters were reported to have hidden. By 1864, the Wiregrass Region of Georgia was no longer fully controlled by the Confederate government due to layout and deserter gangs.

During the same time, the backcountry of Pulaski, Montgomery, and Telfair  counties in the area of Gum Swamp Creek in modern-day Dodge County had become home to similar groups.

Debate over the use of slaves as soldiers

Late in the war, when it was suggested that the Confederacy use its slaves as soldiers, many Confederate newspapers, such as the Atlanta Southern Confederacy in Macon, vehemently objected to the idea of armed black men in the Confederate army, saying that it was incongruous with the Confederacy's goals and views regarding African Americans and slavery. The newspaper said that using black men as soldiers would be an embarrassment to Confederates and their children, saying that although African Americans should be used for slave labor, they should not be used as armed soldiers, opining that:

Georgian Confederates such as Democrat Howell Cobb supported the Macon newspaper's view, saying that the Confederates using black soldiers was "suicidal" and would run contrary to the Confederacy's ideology. Opposing such a move, Cobb stated that African Americans were untrustworthy and innately lacked the qualities to make good soldiers, and that using them would cause many Confederates to quit the army:

Despite these protests, a law to raise troops from the slave population was passed by the Confederate Congress on March 13, 1865.  By mid-April, a few recruiting stations had been established in Macon, Georgia, but the results of these efforts are unknown.

Battles in Georgia
Georgia was relatively free from warfare until late 1863. A total of nearly 550 battles and skirmishes occurred within the state, with the majority occurring in the last two years of the conflict. The first major battle in Georgia was a Confederate victory at the Battle of Chickamauga in 1863, which was the last major Confederate victory in the west. In 1864 Union general William T. Sherman's armies invaded Georgia as part of the Atlanta Campaign. Confederate general Joseph E. Johnston fought a series of battles, the largest being the Battle of Kennesaw Mountain, trying to delay Union armies for as long as possible as he retreated toward Atlanta. Johnston's replacement, Gen. John Bell Hood, attempted several unsuccessful counterattacks at the Battle of Peachtree Creek and the Battle of Atlanta, but Sherman captured Atlanta on September 2, 1864.

List of battles fought in Georgia

 Battle of Adairsville
 Battle of Allatoona
 Battle of Atlanta
 Battle of Brown's Mill
 Battle of Buck Head Creek
 Battle of Chickamauga
 Battle of Columbus
 Battle of Dallas
 Battle of Dalton I
 Battle of Dalton II
 Battle of Davis' Cross Roads
 Battle of Ezra Church
 Battle of Fort McAllister (1863)
 Battle of Fort McAllister (1864)
 Battle of Fort Pulaski
 Battle of Griswoldville
 Battle of Jonesborough
 Battle of Kennesaw Mountain
 Battle of Kolb's Farm
 Battle of Lovejoy's Station
 Battle of Marietta
 Battle of New Hope Church
 Battle of Peachtree Creek
 Battle of Pickett's Mill
 Battle of Resaca
 Battle of Ringgold Gap
 Battle of Rocky Face Ridge
 Battle of Utoy Creek
 Battle of Waynesboro

The Atlanta Campaign

Union Maj. Gen. William T. Sherman invaded Georgia from the vicinity of Chattanooga, Tennessee, beginning in May 1864, opposed by the Confederate general Joseph E. Johnston. Johnston's Army of Tennessee withdrew toward Atlanta in the face of successive flanking maneuvers by Sherman's group of armies. In July, Confederate president Jefferson Davis replaced Johnston with the more aggressive John Bell Hood, who began challenging the Union Army in a series of damaging frontal assaults. Hood's army was eventually besieged in Atlanta and the city fell on September 2, setting the stage for Sherman's March to the Sea and hastening the end of the war.

Sherman's March to the Sea

In November 1864, Sherman stripped his army of non-essentials, burned the city of Atlanta, and left it to the Confederates. He began his famous Sherman's March to the Sea, living off the land then burning plantations, wrecking railroads, killing livestock, and freeing slaves. Thousands of escaped slaves followed him as he entered Savannah on December 22. After the loss of Atlanta, the governor withdrew the state's militia from the Confederate forces to harvest crops for the state and the army. The militia did not try to stop Sherman.

Sherman's March was devastating to both Georgia and the Confederacy in terms of economics and psychology. Sherman himself estimated that the campaign had inflicted $100 million (about $1.4 billion in 2012 dollars) in damages, about one fifth of which "inured to our advantage" while the "remainder is simple waste and destruction." His army wrecked  of railroad and numerous bridges and miles of telegraph lines. It seized 5,000 horses, 4,000 mules, and 13,000 head of cattle. It confiscated 9.5 million pounds of corn and 10.5 million pounds of fodder, and destroyed uncounted cotton gins and mills.

Sherman's campaign of total war extended to Georgian civilians. In July 1864, during the Atlanta campaign, Sherman ordered approximately 400 Roswell mill workers, mostly women, arrested as traitors and shipped as prisoners to the North with their children. There is little evidence that more than a few of the women ever returned home.

The memory of Sherman's March became iconic and central to the "Myth of the Lost Cause" and neo-Confederates. The crisis was the setting for Margaret Mitchell's 1936 novel Gone with the Wind and the subsequent 1939 film.

County courthouses destroyed
During the war, twelve county courthouses were destroyed by the U.S. Army. 

 The courthouse of McIntosh County at Darien was destroyed in June 1863 when the U.S. Army burned most of the town.

 The Dade County courthouse was destroyed in 1863 during the Chattanooga Campaign. 

 The courthouses of Cherokee County, Clayton County, Cobb County, Polk County, and Whitfield County were destroyed in 1864 during the Atlanta Campaign. 

 The courthouses of Bulloch County, Butts County, Screven County, Washington County, and Wilkinson County were destroyed during Sherman's March to the Sea in 1864.

The courthouse in Catoosa County at Ringgold was spared by U.S. General William T. Sherman when he learned it was also a Masonic lodge.

Last battles
In December 1864, Sherman captured Savannah before leaving Georgia in January 1865 to begin his Carolinas Campaign. However, there were still several small fights in Georgia after his departure. On April 16, 1865, the Battle of Columbus, was fought on the Georgia-Alabama border. In 1935, the state legislature officially declared this engagement as the "last battle of the War Between the States."

Re-entry to the Union

Following the end of the Civil War, Georgia was part of the Third Military District.

The war left most of Georgia devastated, with many dead and wounded, and the state's economy in shambles. The slaves were emancipated in 1865, and Reconstruction started immediately after the hostilities ceased.  Georgia did not re-enter the Union until July 15, 1870, as the last of the former Confederate states to be re-admitted.

The state remained poor well into the twentieth century.

Civil War sites in Georgia

Many of Georgia's Civil War battlefields, particularly those around Atlanta, have been lost to modern urban development. However, a number of sites have been well preserved, including Chickamauga and Chattanooga National Military Park and Kennesaw Mountain National Battlefield Park. Other sites related to the Civil War include Stone Mountain, Fort Pulaski, and the Atlanta Cyclorama.

A number of antebellum mansions and plantations in Georgia are preserved and open to the public, particularly around Atlanta and Savannah. Portions of the Civil War-era Western & Atlantic Railroad have historical markers commemorating events during the war, including several sites associated with the Andrews Raid. The Civil War Heartland Leaders Trail includes 46 sites from Gainesville to Millegeville. Another area near Atlanta with Civil War history is in the Sweetwater Creek State Park  in Douglas County, Georgia. At this location is one of the last standing buildings burned by General Sherman's army, New Manchester Mill.

See also 

 List of Georgia Confederate Civil War regiments
 List of Georgia Union Civil War units

Notes

Footnotes

Citations

References

 Bailey, Anne J. and Walter J. Fraser. Portraits of Conflict: A Photographic History of Georgia in the Civil War (1996) 
 
 Myers, Robert Manson, ed. The Children of Pride: A True Story of Georgia and the Civil War (1972) 
 "Rebel Yell: The Civil War Diary of John Thomas Whatley, CSA", edited by John Wilson Cowart, is the diary of a confederate soldier whose work included preparing for the defense of Savannah, Georgia. The diary documents his life from March 2, 1862, till November 27, 1864.

Further reading

 Brady, Lisa M. Brady. War upon the Land: Military Strategy and the Transformation of Southern Landscapes during the American Civil War (University of Georgia Press, 2012)
 Brown, Barry L. and Gordon R. Elwell. Crossroads of Conflict: A Guide to Civil War Sites in Georgia (2010) 
 Bryan, T. Conn. Confederate Georgia (1953), the standard scholarly survey
 Davis, Stephen, What the Yankees Did to Us: Sherman's Bombardment and Wrecking of Atlanta. (Macon, GA: Mercer University Press, 2012). 
 DeCredico, Mary A. Patriotism for Profit: Georgia's Urban Entrepreneurs and the Confederate War Effort (1990).
 Ecelbarger, Gary The Day Dixie Died: The Battle of Atlanta (2010), .
 Fowler, John D. and David B. Parker, eds. Breaking the Heartland: The Civil War in Georgia (2011) 
 Frank, Lisa Tendrich. The Civilian War: Confederate Women and Union Soldiers During Sherman's March (LSU Press, 2015)
 Gourley, Bruce T. Diverging Loyalties: Baptists in Middle Georgia During the Civil War (2011) 
 Griffin, Richard W. "The Augusta (Georgia) Manufacturing Company in Peace, War, and Reconstruction, 1847–1877." Business History Review 32.1 (1958): 60-73.

 Harrington, Hugh T. Civil War Milledgeville: Tales from the Confederate Capital of Georgia (2005) 
 Hill, Louise Biles. Joseph E. Brown and the Confederacy. (1972)
 
 Johnson, Michael P. Toward A Patriarchal Republic: The Secession of Georgia (1977)
 Jones, Charles Edgeworth (1909). Georgia in the War: 1861–1865. Augusta, Georgia: Foote and Davies.
 Miles, Jim. To the Sea: A History and Tour Guide of the War in the West, Sherman's March Across Georgia and Through the Carolinas, 1864–1865 (2002) 
 Mohr, Clarence L. On the Threshold of Freedom: Masters and Slaves in Civil War Georgia (1986) 
 Parks, Joseph H.  Joseph E. Brown of Georgia Louisiana State University Press (1977) 612 pages; Governor of Georgia
 Savas, Theodore P., and David A. Woodbury. The Campaign for Atlanta and Sherman's March to the Sea Volume 1. Casemate Publishers, 2013.
 Smith, Derek. Civil War Savannah. Savannah, Ga: Frederic C. Beil, 1997. .
 Wallenstein, Peter. "Rich Man's War, Rich Man's Fight: Civil War and the Transformation of Public Finance in Georgia," Journal of Southern History (1984) 50#1 pp 15–42 in JSTOR 
 Wetherington, Mark V. Plain Folk's Fight: The Civil War and Reconstruction in Piney Woods Georgia (2009)  excerpt and text search
 Whelchel, Love Henry. Sherman's March and the Emergence of the Independent Black Church Movement: From Atlanta to the Sea to Emancipation (Palgrave Macmillan, 2014)
 Whites, Lee Ann.  The Civil War as a Crisis in Gender: Augusta, Georgia, 1860–1890 (2000) excerpt and text search
 Williams, David. Georgia's Civil War: Conflict on the Home Front.'' Macon, GA: Mercer University Press, 2017.

External links

 A contemporary broadside of Georgias Ordinance of Secession
 Declaration of Causes of Seceding States - Ordinances of Secession of Georgia, Mississippi, South Carolina, and Texas
 University of Georgia website for Georgia in the Civil War
 National Park Service map of Civil War sites in Georgia
 Civil War Sites in Georgia
 This Week in Georgia Civil War History Site from GeorgiaInfo
 Cobb County Civil War historical markers on a map.
 http://portcolumbus.org/
 The Madden Branch Massacre historical marker
 William Clayton Fain: Georgia Unionist historical marker

 
.American Civil War
American Civil War by state
American Civil War
 
Western Theater of the American Civil War